Oconee Hill Cemetery is a cemetery in Athens, Georgia, United States. The extant cemetery opened in 1856 and is located near the University of Georgia.

Oconee Hill Cemetery was purchased in 1855 by the city of Athens when further burials were prohibited in the old town cemetery on land owned by the University of Georgia.

On May 22, 2013, it was added to the National Register of Historic Places.

Notable interments
 Omer Clyde Aderhold, president of the University of Georgia.
 David Crenshaw Barrow Jr., chancellor (president) of the University of Georgia.
 William M. Browne, general in the Confederate States Army during the American Civil War.
 Frank Hardeman Brumby, United States Navy four-star admiral.
 Wally Butts, Georgia Bulldogs football head coach.
 Henry Hull Carlton, United States Representative for Georgia's 8th congressional district.
 Eve Carson, Student Leader from University of North Carolina, and homicide victim.
 Augustin Smith Clayton, United States Representative from Georgia.
 Howell Cobb, 23rd Speaker of the United States House of Representatives, Governor of Georgia, United States Secretary of the Treasury.
 Thomas Reade Rootes Cobb, Confederate general.
 Frederick Corbet Davison, president of the University of Georgia.
 Vince Dooley, former head coach of the Georgia Bulldogs and former athletic director of the University of Georgia.
 Ben T. Epps, known as "Georgia's First Aviator" and an American aviation pioneer.
 Luther Glenn, Mayor of Atlanta from 1858 to 1860.
 Sampson Willis Harris, United States Representative for Alabama's 3rd congressional district and Alabama's 7th congressional district.
 Young L.G. Harris, Athens Judge, state representative and namesake of Young Harris College and Young Harris, Georgia
 Bill Hartman, former Georgia Bulldogs football player and coach and Washington Redskins player.
 Walter Barnard Hill, chancellor (president) of the University of Georgia.
 William Bailey Lamar, United States Representative for Florida's 3rd congressional district.
 Andrew A. Lipscomb, chancellor (president) of the University of Georgia.
 Crawford Long, physician noted for early use of diethyl ether as an anesthetic.
 Ann Orr Morris, Athens-born silversmith and jeweller.
 Tinsley W. Rucker Jr., United States Representative for Georgia's 8th congressional district.
 Dean Rusk, United States Secretary of State from 1961 to 1969 under presidents John F. Kennedy and Lyndon B. Johnson.
 Mildred Lewis Rutherford, historian general of the United Daughters of the Confederacy.
 Lucy May Stanton, artist known for her portrait miniatures
 Robert Grier Stephens Jr., United States Representative for Georgia's 10th congressional district.
 Samuel Joelah Tribble, United States Representative for Georgia's 8th congressional district.
 Ricky Wilson, guitarist in the rock band The B-52's.

Further reading

References

External links
 Official webpage
 
  AHS publishes annotated cemetery book 2009
 Oconee Hill Cemetery historical marker

Buildings and structures in Athens, Georgia
Protected areas of Clarke County, Georgia
1856 establishments in Georgia (U.S. state)
Tourist attractions in Athens, Georgia
Cemeteries on the National Register of Historic Places in Georgia (U.S. state)
National Register of Historic Places in Clarke County, Georgia